Gutur Gu is a silent comedy broadcast on the Indian satellite television channel SAB TV, produced by B. P. Singh  and directed by Prabal Barua. It was also India's first silent comedy series. Its cast include, Sheetal Maulik and Sunil Grover along with Nayan Bhatt, Bhavana Balsavar, Jaydutt Vyas and KK Goswami. The show's cast members do not speak on screen.

Plot

 The first season follows Balu who lives with his wife, parents and his grandmother. The episodes feature a series of incidents and confusions that Balu creates.
 The second season revolves around a Punjabi family  living in Mumbai.
 The third Season follows Balu who lives with his wife, parents and Pappu Maharaj. The episodes feature a series of incidents and confusions that Balu creates.
The fourth season follow Bakulesh Shah lives with his wife, parents, sister and their cook K.K Joshi. The episodes feature a series of incidents and confusions that Bakul creates.

Cast

Season One

 Sunil Grover / Kunal Kumar as Balu Kumar (2010-2012)
 Sheetal Maulik as Smita Balu Kumar (2010-2012)
 Nayan Bhatt as Dadi (2010-2012)
 Bhavna Balsavar as Babita Jay Kumar (2010-2012)
 Jaydutt Vyas as Jay Kumar (2010-2012)
 KK Goswami as Pappu Maharaj (2010-2012)
 Dayanand Shetty as Harpreet Singh (2010-2012)
 Jay Thakkar as Cheeku (2010-2012)

Season Two
 Jaydutt Vyas / Jagat Rawat as Jay Ahuja (2012-2013)
 Bhavna Balsavar as Bhavna Jay Ahuja (2012-2012)
 Rahul Lohani as Rahul Ahuja (2012-2013)
 Anita Hassanandani as Anita Rahul Ahuja (2012-2013)
 Shyam Mashalkar as Shyam Ahuja (2012-2013)
 Bhairavi Raichura as Bhairavi Shyam Ahuja (2012-2013)
 KK Goswami as K K (2012-2013)
 Dayanand Shetty as Daya Singh (2012-2013)
 Nilesh Divekar as Professor Iyer (2012-2013)
 Vijay Patkar as Shopkeeper of Fit Fat Shoes
 Kushal Punjabi as Dancer
 Atul Parchure as a convict

Season 3
 Kunal Kumar as Balu Kumar (2014)
 Sheetal Maulik as Smita Balu Kumar (2014)
 Shafique Ansari as Jay Kumar (2014)
 Bhavna Balsavar as Babita Jay Kumar (2014)
 KK Goswami as Pappu Maharaj (2014)
 Dayanand Shetty as Bully Neighbor (2014)
 Harsh Mittal as Cheeku (2014)
 Nilesh Divekar as Dr. Invento (2014)

References

External links
 Official Website of Gutur Gu Season 2

Sony SAB original programming
2010 Indian television series debuts
Indian comedy television series
2014 Indian television series endings